Matt Walker (born June 15, 1977) is an American football coach and former baseball coach.  He is the head football coach at the University of Wisconsin–River Falls, a position he has held since the 2011 season.  Walker served as the head football coach DePauw University from 2006 to 2008.  He was also the head baseball coach at DePauw from 2000 to 2009, tallying a mark of 253–166.

Head coaching record

Football

References

External links
 Wisconsin–River Falls profile

1977 births
Living people
American football quarterbacks
Baseball pitchers
Butler Bulldogs football coaches
DePauw Tigers baseball coaches
DePauw Tigers baseball players
DePauw Tigers football coaches
DePauw Tigers football players
Wisconsin–River Falls Falcons football coaches
Indiana State University alumni
People from Crawfordsville, Indiana